Ruth Mary Clarisse Cholmondeley, Lady Delamere (née Ashley, formerly Cunningham-Reid and Gardner; 	22 July 1906 – 10 October 1986), was a British heiress and socialite. A granddaughter of German-Jewish banker Sir Ernest Cassel, she inherited an estate including a large manor house in Six Mile Bottom and half of her grandfather's fortune (valued at approximately £50 million in 2020). The Cincinnati Enquirer referred to her as "England's wealthiest girl" when reporting on her first marriage to Captain Alec Cunningham-Reid. She was married three times, becoming a peeress after her third marriage to Thomas Cholmondeley, 4th Baron Delamere. Lady Delamere was the younger sister of Edwina Mountbatten, Countess Mountbatten of Burma.

Early life and family 
Lady Delamere was born Ruth Mary Clarisse Ashley on 22 July 1906 in Stanmore. She was the youngest daughter of Colonel Wilfrid Ashley, 1st Baron Mount Temple and Amalia Mary Maud Cassel. Her older sister was Edwina Mountbatten, Countess Mountbatten of Burma. Lady Delamere's paternal grandfather, Evelyn Ashley, was Under-Secretary of State for the Colonies, a Member of Parliament, and the younger son of Anthony Ashley-Cooper, 7th Earl of Shaftesbury. Her maternal grandfather, Sir Ernest Cassel, was a Prussian-born Jewish banker and capitalist who became a British subject and converted to Catholicism. She was a first cousin of Sir Felix Cassel, 1st Baronet.

Lady Delamere's mother died from tuberculosis in 1911, and her father married a second time to Muriel Forbes-Sempill.

She was described by her niece, Lady Pamela Hicks, as "rather excitable" and "flighty".

Adult life 
In 1921, Lady Delamere's grandfather, Sir Ernest Cassel, died, leaving her sister and her the majority of his estate (worth around £50 million in 2020). As part of her inheritance, Lady Delamere received Six Mile Bottom Hall, a large Tudor country house in Six Mile Bottom.

On 12 May 1927, she married Captain Alec Cunningham-Reid, a military officer and politician. The couple was described by The Cincinnati Enquirer as "England's wealthiest girl and handsomest man", They had two children, Michael Duncan Alec Cunningham-Reid and Noel Robert Cunningham-Reid. On their honeymoon, she insisted that they share her wealth because "no decent woman likes to have a man live with her in charity", but when they divorced in 1940, Cunningham-Reid sued for half of her $400,000 annual income.

On 3 September 1940, she married a second time to Major Ernest Laurie Gardner. They divorced in 1943. She married a third time, on 15 June 1944, to Thomas Cholmondeley, 4th Baron Delamere. She and Lord Delamere divorced in 1955.

References 

1906 births
1986 deaths
20th-century English women
Mary
Delamere
British people of German-Jewish descent
Mary
Daughters of barons
English socialites
People from Stanmore